Dowkana (also Romanized as Dowkānā; also known as Dokāneh) is a village in Margavar Rural District, Silvaneh District, Urmia County, West Azerbaijan Province, Iran. At the 2006 census, its population was 268, in 58 families.

References 

Populated places in Urmia County